The North Riding of Yorkshire is a subdivision of  Yorkshire, England, alongside York, the East Riding and West Riding. The riding's highest point is at Mickle Fell with 2,585 ft (788 metres).

From the Restoration it was used as a lieutenancy area, having been previously part of the Yorkshire lieutenancy. Each riding was treated as a county for many purposes, such as quarter sessions. An administrative county, based on the riding, was created with a county council in 1889 under the Local Government Act 1888. In 1974 both the administrative county and  the North Riding of Yorkshire lieutenancy were abolished, replaced in most of the riding by the non-metropolitan county and lieutenancy of North Yorkshire.

History
Archives from 1808 record that  the "north-riding of York-shire" had  once consisted  of  "fifty-one lordships" owned by Robert the Bruce. During the English Civil War, the North Riding predominantly supported the royalist cause, while other areas of Yorkshire tended to support the parliamentarians.

Governance and administration
The County of York, North Riding administrative county was formed in 1889. In 1894 it was divided into municipal boroughs, urban districts and rural districts under the Local Government Act 1894. Middlesbrough had already been incorporated as a municipal borough in 1853 and formed a county borough, exempt from county council control, from 1889. Richmond and Scarborough had been incorporated as municipal boroughs in 1835, with Thornaby-on-Tees added in 1892.

The urban districts in 1894 were Eston, Guisborough, Hinderwell, Kirkleatham, Kirklington cum Upsland, Loftus, Malton, Masham, Northallerton, Pickering, Redcar, Saltburn and Marske by the Sea, Scalby, Skelton and Brotton and Whitby. In 1922 Redcar was incorporated as a borough.

The rural districts in 1894 were Aysgarth, Bedale, Croft, Easingwold, Flaxton, Guisborough, Helmsley, Kirkby Moorside, Leyburn, Malton, Masham, Middlesbrough, Northallerton, Pickering, Reeth, Richmond, Scarborough, Startforth, Stokesley, Thirsk, Wath and Whitby.

County Review Orders reduced the number of urban and rural districts in the county:
Hinderwell urban district was absorbed by Whitby rural district in 1932
A new Saltburn and Marske by the Sea urban district was formed from Saltburn by the Sea urban district and part of Guisborough rural district. the remainder of Guisborough RD passed to Loftus urban district and Whitby rural district in 1932
Kirklington cum Upsland urban district was absorbed by Bedale rural district in 1934
Masham urban district was redesignated as Masham rural district in 1934

In 1968 a new Teesside county borough was created, taking in Middlesbrough and parts of the administrative areas of Durham and North Riding councils. From the North Riding came the Redcar Borough and Saltburn-Marske Urban District, Thornaby-on-Tees Borough (formerly part of the Stokesley's rural district) and Eston's urban district. Tees-Side also included parts north of the River Tees historically in Durham. The area was associated with the North Riding for lieutenancy and other purposes.

Sub-cultural area
In 1974 the North Riding authorities were abolished. The majority of its former area became part of a North Yorkshire administrative area. This area includes a northern part of the West Riding as well as the northern and western parts of the pre-1974 East Riding.  Land in and around the former Teesside county borough became part of Cleveland county.

In 1996, Cleveland county was abolished with Middlesbrough, Redcar-and-Cleveland and a part of the Stockton district assigned to the North Yorkshire lieutenancy, becoming known as a similarly named conurbation to the previous county borough called Teesside. The City of York borough also became a unitary authority. The former Startforth Rural District (remaining land south of the Tees) is the only part of the North Riding outside of the North Yorkshire lieutenancy since 1974, under County Durham Council area and until 2009 in areas Teesdale district.

The North Riding is now represented by all of Hambleton, Richmondshire, Ryedale, Scarborough, Middlesbrough, Redcar and Cleveland. It is also represented by parts of Harrogate, Stockton-on-Tees, City of York and County Durham council area.

The principal towns of the cultural and historic riding are Middlesbrough, Redcar, Whitby, Scarborough and Northallerton.

Proposed resurrection of name 
On three occasions a re-use of the name of the North Riding for local government purposes has been considered. During the 1990s UK local government reform, the Banham Commission suggested uniting Richmondshire, Hambleton, Ryedale and Scarborough districts in a new unitary authority called North Riding of Yorkshire. Later, the government proposed renaming the ceremonial county of North Yorkshire the North Riding of Yorkshire. This was deemed inappropriate and rejected, after a "chorus of disapprobation".

During a further local government review in the 2000s as part of the preparations for the regional assembly referendums, a unitary authority with the name North Riding of Yorkshire, consisting of Richmondshire, Hambleton, Ryedale and Scarborough was again suggested. However, the Commission withdrew this in favour or two unitary authorities, one for Hambleton and Richmondshire, the other for Ryedale and Scarborough.

Ancient divisions
Unlike most counties in England, which were divided anciently into hundreds, Yorkshire was divided first into three ridings and then into numerous wapentakes within each riding. Within the North Riding of Yorkshire there were thirteen wapentakes in total, as follows:

Wapentakes

See also
List of Lord Lieutenants of the North Riding
List of High Sheriffs of North Yorkshire
Custos Rotulorum of the North Riding of Yorkshire – List of Keepers of the Rolls

References

External links
Map of the North Riding of Yorkshire on Wikishire
Information on the North Riding of Yorkshire on I'm From Yorkshire

 
History of local government in Yorkshire
Geography of North Yorkshire
History of North Yorkshire
Local government in North Yorkshire
Yorkshire, North Riding